Charles Townsend (1832-November 4, 1908) was a British Liberal politician who represented Bristol North in the House of Commons from 1892 to 1895.

Electoral history

References

External links 
 Charles Townsend on Hansard

1832 births
1908 deaths
Politicians from Bristol
UK MPs 1892–1895
Liberal Party (UK) MPs for English constituencies